Dormaalocyon ("dog from Dormaal") is an extinct genus of placental mammals from clade Carnivoraformes, that lived in Europe during early Eocene. Type species, Dormaalocyon latouri was discovered when fossils were unearthed in the village of Dormaal, near Zoutleeuw, in the Belgian province of Flemish Brabant.

Phylogeny
The phylogenetic relationships of genus Dormaalocyon are shown in the following cladogram:

See also
 Mammal classification
 Carnivoraformes
 Royal Belgian Institute of Natural Sciences

References

†
Prehistoric placental genera
Fossil taxa described in 2014
2014 in Belgium
Fossils of Belgium
Zoutleeuw